Complete Discography is a 1989 compilation album released by the American hardcore punk band Minor Threat on the band's own Dischord Records. As the name implies, it contains the band's entire discography at the time, including their three EPs, the Out of Step album and Flex Your Head compilation tracks. Some tracks were unreleased at the time and didn't appear on this compilation, but were later released. This includes the songs "Understand" and "Asshole Dub" from 20 Years of Dischord.

The cover is very similar to that of Minor Threat, featuring the same photo of singer Ian MacKaye's younger brother, Alec MacKaye. The album was released with the cover in multiple colors, including red and green and a 2003 remastered version in blue and yellow.

In 2018, Pitchfork ranked it the 23rd best album of the 1980s, while LA Weekly ranked it the 2nd best hardcore punk album of all time in 2013. The latter's Patrick James wrote: "Sure, it's not technically an album, but there is nonetheless no better introduction to the genre of hardcore than Minor Threat's Complete Discography. [...] That Minor Threat's entire body of work fits on one CD doesn't diminish its significance; even today, it's still perfectly out of step (with the world)."

Track listing 
All tracks by Minor Threat, except where noted.

Personnel 
 Ian MacKaye – vocals
 Lyle Preslar – guitar
 Brian Baker – bass guitar on tracks 1–14 and 24–26, guitar on tracks 15–23
 Steve Hansgen – bass guitar on tracks 15–23
 Jeff Nelson – drums
 Cynthia Connolly – Drawing
 Glen E. Friedman – Photography
 Skip Groff – Mixing
 Susie Josephson – Photography
 Minor Threat – Producer, Mixing
 Tomas Squip – Photography
 Don Zientara – Engineer

References 

Minor Threat albums
1989 compilation albums
Dischord Records compilation albums